Malcolmiella is a genus of lichenized fungi in the family Pilocarpaceae.

Taxonomy
The genus was circumscribed by Czech lichenologist Antonín Vězda 1997, with Malcolmiella cinereovirens as the type, and only species. The generic name honours William McLagan Malcolm (born 1936), a  New Zealand-born American botanist and botanical illustrator who specialised in cryptogams. M. interversa was added as a second species in 2021 (transferred from genus Lecidea).

References

Pilocarpaceae
Lichen genera
Lecanorales genera
Taxa named by Antonín Vězda
Taxa described in 1997